The Battle of Bulltown was a small skirmish fought during the American Civil War near Bulltown in Braxton County, West Virginia on October 13, 1863.

Background
In the fall of 1863, William Lowther Jackson, the cousin of "Stonewall" Jackson, led a raiding party of 800 men into central West Virginia to capture the strategic "fort" at Bulltown which overlooked an important crossing of the Little Kanawha River. The goal was to cut Federal communications between the Greenbrier and Kanawha Valleys.

The Union garrison of roughly 400 men was commanded by Captain William Mattingly. The Union troops manned a "fort" of makeshift log barricades and shallow trenches which can still be seen today.

Battle
Jackson approached Bulltown secretly. He divided his forces in an attempt to converge on the Union position from two different directions. The Confederates advanced at 4:30am on October 13. They quickly captured the Federal pickets but failed to take the main garrison by surprise.

The Confederates advanced against the fort and a drawn out skirmish lasted until about 4:30pm, almost twelve hours after the battle began. Twice, Jackson sent a flag of truce with a demand to surrender to Captain Simpson, asking him to surrender, but Simpson answered back that "he would fight them until Hell froze over, and if he had to retreat he would retreat on ice."

Jackson eventually retreated back towards the Greenbrier Valley. Casualties were very light considering the length of the battle. On the Union side there were no fatalities. Captain Mattingly was wounded in the thigh and there were some other slight wounds in the Federal camp. The Confederates lost eight killed and a like number wounded.

One civilian, Moses Cunningham, who owned the farm on which the majority of the battle took place, was wounded when he ran out of his house shouting "Hurrah for Jeff Davis."

Aftermath
The battle was the last significant Confederate offensive in West Virginia and the Confederate goals of disrupting the Federal communications were thwarted.

See also
Burnsville Lake, a reservoir impounding the Little Kanawha River at Bulltown
Union Civil War Fortification, listed on the National Register of Historic Places in 1984.

References

Bibliography
 Hardway, Ronald V. On Our Own Soil: William Lowther Jackson and the Civil War in West Virginia's Mountains Quarrier Press. October 3, 2003,

External links

1863 in West Virginia
Conflicts in 1863
Battles of the Eastern Theater of the American Civil War
Union victories of the American Civil War
Battles of the American Civil War in West Virginia
Braxton County, West Virginia
October 1863 events